Gonzalo Núñez (born July 21, 1954) is an Ecuadorian-American former professional tennis player.

Núñez was born in the Ecuadorian city of Guayaquil and moved to the United States in the mid-1970s to live with relatives in New Jersey. He played collegiate tennis for the University of Texas and was the 1975 national amateur grass court champion.

A Davis Cup representative for Ecuador in 1975, Núñez competed on the Grand Prix circuit mostly in doubles tournaments. He won an ATP Challenger doubles title in Barcelona in 1981.

Challenger titles

Doubles: (1)

See also
List of Ecuador Davis Cup team representatives

References

External links
 
 
 

1954 births
Living people
Ecuadorian male tennis players
American male tennis players
Texas Longhorns men's tennis players
Ecuadorian emigrants to the United States
Sportspeople from Guayaquil